Alan Dugan (February 12, 1923 – September 3, 2003) was an American poet.  
 
His first volume Poems published in 1961 was a chosen by the Yale Series of Younger Poets and went on to win the National Book Award for Poetry and the Pulitzer Prize for Poetry. 
His last volume, entitled Poems Seven: New and Complete Poetry, was published in 2001 by Seven Stories Press in New York City and won Dugan a second National Book Award.

Life
Dugan grew up in Jamaica, Queens, and served in World War II, experiences which entered his poetry, though he was not a confessional poet. 
He lived in Truro, Massachusetts on Cape Cod, where he was a member of the Writing Committee of the Fine Arts Work Center.

Dugan's work was published in successive numbered collections under the simple title Poems.

Alan Dugan was married to the artist Judith Shahn, to whom he dedicated each of his books. He died on September 3, 2003, of pneumonia at age 80.

Awards
Dugan received many awards and fellowships for his poetry.
Poems (1961): Yale Series of Younger Poets, National Book Award for Poetry, Pulitzer Prize for Poetry.
Poems Seven: New and Complete Poetry (2001): National Book Award.
Awarded the Prix De Rome by the National Institute of Arts and Letters (1962)
The Shelley Memorial Award: Poetry Society of America (1982)
The Award in Literature: American Academy and Institute of Arts and Letters (1985)
Awarded the Lannan Literary Award for Poetry in 2002.

Works
 Poems (1961)
 Poems 2 (1963)
 Poems 3 (1967)
 Poems 4 (1974)
 Poems Five: New and Collected Poems (1983)
 Poems Six (1989)
 Poems Seven: New and Complete Poetry (2001)

See also

American poetry
List of poets from the United States

References

1923 births
2003 deaths
United States Army Air Forces personnel of World War II
American male poets
National Book Award winners
Pulitzer Prize for Poetry winners
Writers from Queens, New York
Yale Younger Poets winners
20th-century American poets
20th-century American male writers